Appointment in Berlin (also known as Assignment in Berlin) is a 1943 American war drama film directed by Alfred E. Green and starring George Sanders, Marguerite Chapman and Onslow Stevens. The film's plot follows an R.A.F. officer who infiltrates the German high command by broadcasting a series of pro-Nazi messages.

Premise
After being discharged from the Royal Air Force for anti-British activities, an officer becomes a secret agent for Britain's Secret Service. He denounces his country and poses as a radio personality for Nazi Germany.

Cast

Production

The film's art direction was by Lionel Banks and Walter Holscher.

References

Bibliography
 Etling, Laurence. Radio in the Movies: A History and Filmography, 1926-2010. McFarland, 2011.

External links

1943 films
1940s spy drama films
1940s war drama films
American spy drama films
American war drama films
Films directed by Alfred E. Green
Films produced by Samuel Bischoff
American black-and-white films
World War II films made in wartime
World War II spy films
Films about Nazi Germany
Films set in London
1943 drama films
1940s English-language films